The bearded screech owl (Megascops barbarus) is a small "typical owl" in subfamily Striginae. It is found in Guatemala and Mexico.

Taxonomy and systematics

The bearded screech owl was first described by Philip Sclater and Osbert Salvin in 1868. It shares genus Megascops with more than 20 other screech owls. It is monotypic. The specific epithet barbarus is derived from the type locality of Santa Bárbara, Vera Paz, Guatemala, and "bearded" is apparently a errant derivation of it (bearded would be barbatus).

Description

The bearded screech owl is the smallest of its genus in North America. In addition to being heavier, females have somewhat longer wings and tails, and in both sexes the wings extend past the tail. The species has two color morphs. In general the predominant one is light gray-brown and the other dark reddish, but more females seem to be of the reddish morph. Intermediates are known. Adults of the gray-brown morph have upperparts of that color with a "collar" and heavy spotting of whitish gray. The facial disc is also gray-brown surrounded by blackish brown. The underparts are pale with darker markings that give an ocellated appearance and feathing extends almost to the toes. The reddish morph replaces the gray-brown with dark reddish brown and the spotting and ocellated appearance are less distinct. Both morphs have a yellow eye, a greenish bill, and unfeathered pink toes.

Distribution and habitat

The bearded screech owl is found from the highlands of central Chiapas, Mexico south and east into the highlands of central and western Guatemala. It inhabits humid temperate montane forest of several types; examples include pine-oak, oak, and cloudforest.

Behavior

Movement

The bearded screech owl is resident throughout its range.

Feeding

The bearded screech owl is entirely nocturnal. It feeds almost exclusively on arthropods, especially beetles, with crickets, moths, roaches, spiders, and scorpions also taken. It hunts in the understory or forest edge, waiting on a perch and pouncing on prey on the ground. It does not take the prey to a perch but eats it where captured. It does not appear to cast pellets.

Breeding

The bearded screech owl is territorial. Its breeding season appears to span from March to June. The only nest ever found was in a natural tree cavity where a reddish female was brooding a gray chick.

Vocalization

The bearded screech owl's territorial song is "a quiet and low-pitched, cricket-like trill of 3-5 [seconds] in duration, rising and dropping at the end." Both sexes sing, the males more often, and the male's song has a lower pitch than the female's. They also give "a soft ventriloquial hu."

Status

The IUCN originally assessed the bearded screech owl as Near Threatened. In 2012 it changed the rating to Vulnerable and in 2020 to Least Concern. Its population has an estimated size of at least 20,000 mature individuals but is believed to be decreasing. Mexican officials have listed it as endangered in that country due to extensive deforestation. "[C]loud and humid pine-oak forests in good condition are restricted in high slopes or high mountains that are of difficult access."

References

External links
http://www.owling.com/Bearded_Screech.htm

bearded screech owl
Birds of Mexico
Birds of Guatemala
bearded screech owl
bearded screech owl
bearded screech owl
Taxonomy articles created by Polbot
Central American pine–oak forests
Central American montane forests